Xu Mengtao (born 12 July 1990) is an Olympic Champion Chinese aerial skier. She has 27 World Cup victories and an Olympic Gold. She is also the current World Cup leader and became the first Chinese woman to win an Olympic gold in the Aerial Ski event during her fourth Olympics at the age of 31. She was one of Team China's flag bearers, at the 2022 Beijing Winter Olympic's closing ceremony.

Career Results

Olympic Games
She competed at the 2010 Winter Olympics, where she qualified eighth, and had the highest score after the first jump in the finals. However, she crashed on her second jump and ended up in sixth place.

Xu brought home a silver medal from the Sochi 2014 Olympics with a score of 83.50 in the Ladies Aerials finals. She had obtained a score of 101.08 in jump 2 of Final 1, the highest score in the finals, but fell in Final 2.

In the 2018 Pyeongchang Olympics, Xu obtained a score of 91 in the first jump, placing her in second place, but crashed in the second jump and did not advance, ending up in 9th overall.

In the 2022 Beijing Olympics, Xu won a silver in the mixed team aerials, and also won a gold medal in the Women's Aerial Ski with a final score of 108.61, after landing a jump with three somersaults, edging out defending champion Hanna Huskova with an impressive score of 107.95 and Ashley Caldwell, who had the highest score in Final 1. In doing so, she became the first Chinese woman to win an Olympic gold in this event, after five previous silvers by Chinese athletes since the event was added in 1994.

World Championships

World Cup

Standings

Individual wins

References

External links

Freestyle skiers at the 2010 Winter Olympics
Freestyle skiers at the 2014 Winter Olympics
Freestyle skiers at the 2018 Winter Olympics
Freestyle skiers at the 2022 Winter Olympics
Olympic freestyle skiers of China
1990 births
Living people
Chinese female freestyle skiers
Medalists at the 2014 Winter Olympics
Medalists at the 2022 Winter Olympics
Olympic gold medalists for China
Olympic silver medalists for China
Olympic medalists in freestyle skiing
Asian Games medalists in freestyle skiing
Freestyle skiers at the 2007 Asian Winter Games
Asian Games silver medalists for China
Medalists at the 2007 Asian Winter Games
Skiers from Jilin